À peu près is the debut studio album by French singer Pomme, released on October 6, 2017 through Polydor Records.

Deluxe edition 

On April 20, 2018 a deluxe edition of À peu près was released in digital download format, featuring five bonus tracks recorded live in the "Sessions Montréalaises", those five tracks were also released separately the next day in vinyl format as an EP with the title A Peu Près - Sessions Montréalaises.

Critical reception 

Madmoizelle's Lucie Kosmala said that accepting the album is "accepting to let oneself be enveloped by a melancholy folk and delightful for the time of thirteen titles", and also praised the lyrics: "Her poetic lyrics interweave metaphors into profound and even spiritual songs". She also referred to the influence of chanson française in her music saying that "other titles finally come to flirt with the chanson française that one could describe as more patrimonial, but at the same time they're being completely modernized, like "Ceux qui rêvent"".

Le Devoir's Sylvain Cormier praised Pomme's voice: "[...] and that voice with a deliciously porous tone, this voice with an astonishing register that goes from the ultra-acute to the subtle melodies".

Track listing

Personnel 
Credits adapted from À peu près liner notes.

Musicians

 Pomme – lead vocals, acoustic guitar (track 1, 3, 6, 12), autoharp (track 1 to 3, 6, 8, 10), backing vocals (track 1, 2, 3, 4, 5, 6, 8, 11), cello (track 3, 5, 8), electric guitar (track 7, 12), double bass (track 2), omnichord (track 4), glockenspiel (track 9)
 Benjamin Hekimian – acoustic guitar , bass , electric guitar , drums  (track 8, 12), percussion (track 1, 6, 8, 10, 12), ukelele (track 2), lap steel guitar (track 3)
 Matthieu Joly – drum programming , keyboards , mellotron , organ (track 1, 6, 8, 10, 12), piano (track 3, 10, 11), synthesizer (track 4), omnichord (track 4)
 Rémi Sanna – drums (track 1, 7, 8, 11, 12)
Olivier Marguerit – bass (track 4), acoustic guitar (track 4), piano (track 4), synthesizer (track 4)
Rafael Angster – bassoon (track 4)
Jean Thévenin – drums (track 4)
Sammy Decoster – electric guitar (track 4)
Yann Arnaud – percussion (track 4)
Stéphane Bellity – synthesizer (track 4)
Julien Bensenior – backing vocals (track 6)
Siméo – guitar (track 13)

Design

Marta Bevacqua – photograph
Frank Loriou – artwork

Production

 Waxx & Matt (Benjamin Hekimian & Matthieu Joly) – production (track 1, 2, 3, 5, 6, 7, 8, 9, 10, 11, 12)
 Yann Arnaud – production (track 4)
 Siméo – production (track 13)
 Nicolas Risser – mastering
 Antoine Gaillet – mixing
 Matthieu Joly – recording  (track 1, 2, 3, 5, 6, 7, 8, 9, 10, 11, 12)
 Yann Arnaud – recording  (track 4)
 Siméo – recording  (track 13)
 Christopher Colesse – recording assistance (track 1, 2, 3, 5, 6, 7, 8, 9, 10, 11, 12)

Recording

 Recorded at Dare Dare Studio and Melodium Studio (Montreuil, Paris)
 Mixed at  Studio Soyouz
 Mastered at Studio Kilohertz
 Produced at Melodium Studio

Charts

References

2017 debut albums
Pomme (singer) albums
Folk rock albums by French artists
Indie pop albums by French artists